Isadora is an unincorporated community in northwest Worth County, Missouri, United States. Isadora is on Missouri Route A, six miles northwest of Grant City and five miles east of Sheridan. The community is on the floodplain of the Grand River and three miles south of the Missouri - Iowa state line.

Isadora was platted in 1863. A post office called Isadora was established in 1866, and remained in operation until 1951. According to tradition, the community was named after the wife of a pioneer man who paid a visit to the area.

References

Unincorporated communities in Worth County, Missouri
Unincorporated communities in Missouri